Abbate and L'Abbate is an Italian surname. Notable people with the surname include:
Allison Abbate (born 1965), American film producer
Anthony Abbate, American former Chicago police officer and criminal
Carlo Abbate (c. 1600–before 1640), Italian music theorist, composer, and Franciscan priest
Carmelo Abbate (born 1971), Italian journalist
Carolyn Abbate (born 1956), American musicologist
Ercole Abbate or Abate or Abati (1573-1613), Italian Mannerist painter 
Federica Abbate (born 1991), Italian songwriter
Fliura Abbate-Bulatova (born 1963), former Soviet and then Italian table tennis player
Florencia Abbate (born 1976), Argentine writer, poet, and journalist
Giuseppe L'Abbate (born 1985), Italian politician
Janet Abbate (born 1962), American computer scientist
Jessie Abbate, American sport shooter 
Jon Abbate (born 1985), former American football player
Leonardo Abbate, better known by his stage name Glovibes, Italian DJ and producer
Lirio Abbate (born 1971), Italian journalist
Mario Abbate (1927-1981), Italian singer
Matteo Abbate (born 1983), former Italian footballer
Michele Abbate, American racing driver
Paolo Abbate (1884–1973), Italian-born sculptor 
Peter Abbate (born 1949), American politician
Simona Abbate (born 1983), Italian water polo player

See also
Abate (disambiguation)
Abbot
Abatte
Abbati

Italian-language surnames